Amar Kahani (Immortal Story) is a 1949 Hindi romantic drama film directed by Baij Sharma. It was produced under the Kamal Kunj Chitra banner. The music was composed by Husnlal Bhagatram, with lyrics by Rajendra Krishan. The film starred P. Jairaj, Suraiya, Ranjana and Jagdish Mehta. Amar Kahani was one of the many films Jairaj and Suraiya starred in together. The others were: Tamanna (1942), Singaar (1949), Rajput (1951, Resham (1952) and Kanchan (1955) (Amar Kahani re-released in a new form).

Cast
 P. Jairaj
 Suraiya
 Ranjana
 Jagdish Mehta

Soundtrack
The music direction was by Husnlal Bhagatram, with lyrics written by Rajendra Krishan. The singers were Suraiya and Geeta Dutt.

Song list

References

External links

1949 films
1940s Hindi-language films
1949 romantic drama films
Indian romantic drama films
Indian black-and-white films
Hindi-language romance films